Sergey Rogov is a Russian political scientist, member of Russian Academy of Sciences, and since 1995 director of the Institute for US and Canadian Studies.

References

External links

Full Members of the Russian Academy of Sciences
Russian political scientists
1948 births
Living people